A commentary of a philosophical text is an analysis of a philosophical text that is undertaken from different angles and points of view, and that enables the study of its nature and characteristics.

A large portion of the schools of thought was originated through the analysis that different commentators carried out on renowned philosophical texts, especially texts from Plato and Aristotle (see Commentaries on Plato and Commentaries on Aristotle). A significant portion of Thomas Aquinas's philosophical ideas were the result of commentaries to some of Aristotle's ideas.

References

Philosophical literature